Eupithecia flavoapicaria is a moth in the family Geometridae. It is found in Japan and Taiwan.

References

Moths described in 1979
flavoapicaria
Moths of Asia